Guy Stéphan (born 17 October 1956) is a French professional football manager who works as assistant coach of the France national team.

Playing career
Stéphan trained in the Perros-Guirec club. In 1976, he was spotted by En Avant de Guingamp, a D3 club where he began a promising career at age 19. The club climbed in D2 in 1977. In 1980 he signed with Rennes, still in D2, while leading head-on and successful studies of physical education teacher (which is worth new selections in France university team).

After two years at Le Havre AC and US Orléans, he joined Stade Malherbe Caen in 1985, which aimed to promote to Division 1. A year later, a car accident put an early end to his career, at 29.

Coaching career
Stéphan immediately decided to become a coach. Stade Malherbe Caen proposed to him to direct their reserve team for the 1987–88 season. He coached FC Montceau Bourgogne, in the 1988–89 season, then Annecy FC. Stéphan made his classes there until 1992, when Raymond Domenech, then coach of Olympique Lyon, called him as assistant coach. He stayed with Jean Tigana for two years, before taking the reins of Olympique Lyon in 1995.

His career then led him to Bordeaux. For four and a half years, while training French coaches, he coached the 17-year-old French team and the A 'team. He was assistant to Roger Lemerre and he won the UEFA Euro 2000 in Netherlands and 2001 FIFA Confederations Cup in Japan.

In October 2002, he signed a contract with Senegal after their impressive performance in 2002 FIFA World Cup. He reached the quarter-final of 2004 African Cup of Nations hosted by Tunisia. Nevertheless, he was relieved of his duties in June 2005 after only two defeats in official matches in 30 months. He later became assistant to Jean Tigana at Beşiktaş, where he served until June 2007.

In May 2009, he was hired by Didier Deschamps as an assistant coach at Olympique de Marseille. In July 2012, he followed Deschamps to the France national team as an assistant. He has been a part of coaching staffs that have led France to the quarterfinal of the 2014 FIFA World Cup in Brazil, the final of UEFA Euro 2016 as the host nation, and then won the 2018 FIFA World Cup in Russia.

Personal life
Guy Stéphan's sons Guillaume and Julien Stéphan are also former footballers and Julien has similarly become a football manager.

Honours
Orders
Knight of the Legion of Honour: 2018

References

External links

 
 Guy Stephan Interview

Living people
1956 births
Sportspeople from Côtes-d'Armor
Footballers from Brittany
French footballers
Association football forwards
En Avant Guingamp players
Stade Rennais F.C. players
Le Havre AC players
US Orléans players
Stade Malherbe Caen players
French football managers
Olympique Lyonnais managers
FC Girondins de Bordeaux managers
FC Annecy managers
Ligue 1 managers
2004 African Cup of Nations managers
Chevaliers of the Légion d'honneur